Prospect Branch is a  long third-order tributary to Marshyhope Creek in Kent County, Delaware.

Course
Prospect Branch rises on the Browns Branch divide about 1-mile west of Harrington, Delaware, and then flows generally southwest to join Marshyhope Creek about 1.5 miles northwest of Adamsville, Delaware.

Watershed
Prospect Branch drains  of area, receives about 45.2 in/year of precipitation, and is about 6.85% forested.

See also
List of rivers of Delaware

References

Rivers of Delaware
Rivers of Kent County, Delaware